The Ford global B-car platform (for "B-class") is a subcompact automobile platform that is jointly developed by Ford Motor Company and Mazda Motor Company at centers in Europe as well as North America and Australia. Previously, Ford has used the Mazda-engineered D platform for its B-segment Ford Festiva (hatchback). This new global B-platform project was initiated by Ford in Dearborn, MI and is equipped with front MacPherson strut and twist-beam rear suspension. The front suspension arms (wishbone) are attached to a pressed-steel welded subframe, which is directly bolted onto the bodyshell. The design is made to accommodate diverse engine options.

B3 
The first iteration of this platform was known as B3. Vehicles utilising this platform include:
 Ford Fiesta (5th generation)
 Ford Figo (1st generation)
 Ford Fusion (Discontinued)
 Ford Ikon (Discontinued)
 Mazda Demio/Mazda2 (Mazda D Platform)
 Mazda Verisa (Mazda D Platform)

B2E
The new B2E platform was designed and developed as Ford’s global B-segment platform. It is the first B-platform developed by Ford's global product development process.

Vehicles utilising (2008–) this global platform include:
 Ford B-Max (Discontinued)
 Ford EcoSport (2nd generation)
 Ford Fiesta (6th generation)
 Ford Fiesta (7th generation)
 Ford Figo (2nd generation)
 Ford Ka (3rd generation)
 Ford Puma (Crossover)
 Ford Transit Courier

References

 
B3